Philodromus marmoratus is a spider species found in Austria, Czech Republic, Bulgaria and Ukraine.

See also 
 List of Philodromidae species

References

External links 

marmoratus
Spiders of Europe
Spiders described in 1891